Samuel Crossman (1623 – 4 February 1683) was a minister of the Church of England and a hymn writer.  He was born at Bradfield Monachorum, now known as Bradfield St George, Suffolk, England.

Crossman earned a Bachelor of Divinity at Pembroke College, University of Cambridge, . After graduation, he ministered to both an Anglican congregation at All Saints, Sudbury, and to a Puritan congregation simultaneously. Crossman sympathized with the Puritan cause, and attended the 1661 Savoy Conference, which attempted to update the Book of Common Prayer so that both Puritans and Anglicans could use it. The conference failed, and the 1662 Act of Uniformity expelled Crossman along with some 2,000 other Puritan-leaning ministers from the Church of England. He renounced his Puritan affiliations shortly afterwards, and was ordained in 1665, becoming a royal chaplain. He was appointed Prebendary of Bristol in 1667 and vicar of Nicholas' Church.  After becoming treasurer of Bristol Cathedral in 1682, he became Dean of Bristol Cathedral in 1683. He died on 4 February 1683 (O.S.; 1684 N.S. – see Old Style and New Style dates), at Bristol, and lies buried in the south aisle of the cathedral at Bristol.

Upon his death, the Cathedral chancellor wrote "Mr Crossman, our new Dean, died this morning: a man lamented by few either of the city or neighbourhood. He hath left a debt upon our church of £300."

Nine of his hymns were published in The Young Man’s Meditation, bound with his The Young Mans Monitor 1664. The merits of his hymns were not recognized until 1868, when one was included in the Anglican Hymn Book with its popularity regarded a phenomenon of the century.

Several of Crossman's hymns are preserved in the Sacred Harp.

Samuel Crossman’s works

The Young Man's Meditation, or Some Few Sacred Poems upon Select Subjects, and Scriptures.
Several of Crossman's hymns are preserved in the Sacred Harp.
My Song Is Love Unknown
Jerusalem On High
Sweet Place

References

1623 births
1683 deaths
Participants in the Savoy Conference
Ejected English ministers of 1662
Christian hymnwriters
English hymnwriters
Musicians from Bristol
People from the Borough of St Edmundsbury
Deans of Bristol
Church of England deans
17th-century English composers
English male composers
Alumni of Pembroke College, Cambridge